Antonia Lofaso (born 1976) is an American celebrity chef and restaurateur. She has appeared on the reality television shows Top Chef, Chopped, Cutthroat Kitchen and Restaurant Startup, among others. Lofaso owns the restaurants Black Market Liquor Bar, Scopa Italian Roots, and DAMA in Los Angeles, California.

Restaurant career

Lofaso attended the French Culinary Institute (now known as the International Culinary Center) in New York City; during that time, she was also a manager at Sean Combs' restaurant, Justin. She then worked as a chef at the Los Angeles restaurants Spago and Foxtail.

Lofaso is currently a co-owner and the executive chef of the Los Angeles restaurants Black Market Liquor Bar, DAMA, and Scopa Italian Roots.

Restaurants 

 Black Market Liquor Bar (2011–present), Los Angeles
 Scopa Italian Roots (2013–present), Los Angeles
 DAMA (2018–present), Los Angeles
 The Local Peasant, Woodland Hills and Sherman Oaks

Television career

In 2008, Lofaso appeared as a contestant on season four of the competition series Top Chef, also known as Top Chef: Chicago; she came in 4th place. She appeared on season eight of Top Chef, known as Top Chef: All-Stars, from 2010 to 2011, coming in 3rd place. In 2014 she appeared on an episode of Top Chef Duels, competing against Mike Isabella, who had beaten her on Top Chef: All-Stars; she won the "duel."

In 2012, Lofaso appeared on the short-lived Game Show Network show Beat the Chefs; she was one of three professional chefs that the amateur chef contestants had to compete against. The show ran for four episodes.

She was one of a rotating group of judges on the 2013 to 2017 Food Network competition show Cutthroat Kitchen. She also competed in (and won) Cutthroats special 2016 "Judging Judges" episode, beating fellow regular judges Simon Majumdar and Jet Tila as well as Iron Chef Geoffrey Zakarian.

She is a judge on Guy's Grocery Games, which premiered in 2013. She has also competed (and won) frequently on that show, beginning a long-standing association with Guy Fieri.

Lofaso served as one of the restaurant culinary consultants for the CNBC television show Restaurant Startup (seasons 2 and 3), in 2015 and 2016.

In 2020, she appeared on Selena Gomez's cooking show, Selena + Chef. She also made an appearance on the 16th season of The Bachelorette during the hometown episode.

Lofaso was one of four chefs featured in the Fieri-produced documentary film Restaurant Hustle 2020: All On The Line, focusing on how the COVID-19 pandemic affected their lives and businesses. She returned for the film’s sequel documentary, Restaurant Hustle 2021: Back In Business.

In January 2022, she appeared as the lead judge on Guy’s Chance Of A Lifetime.

She was the head judge on the Food Network competition show The Julia Child Challenge, which aired in March and April 2022.

In June and July 2022, she hosted Beachside Brawl, and from August through November, she served as co-host of Guy's Ultimate Game Night.

Personal life

Lofaso was born in 1976, and she was born and raised in Northridge in Los Angeles, California. Lofaso has Italian (Sicilian), and Jewish roots.

Lofaso's daughter Xea Myers was born in 2000 from her relationship with the late Jamaican rapper Heavy D. She is known for her health and fitness lifestyle that includes hot and cold exposure via sauna and ice baths and heavy weightlifting.

References

Living people
American television chefs
American people of Jewish descent
American people of Italian descent
American women restaurateurs
American restaurateurs
Food Network chefs
Top Chef contestants
American women chefs
21st-century American women
1976 births
People from Northridge, Los Angeles
Chefs from Los Angeles